Anthony ("Tony") Frederick Orchard (13 March 1941 – 19 August 2005) was a pioneer of inorganic chemistry. His research contributed to laying the foundations of much modern consumer electronic technology.

Tony Orchard was born in Carmarthen, Wales, and moved to Swansea. He studied Chemistry first at Wadham College, Oxford as an undergraduate and then towards a DPhil doctoral degree in theoretical inorganic chemistry at Merton College, Oxford. He left Merton College before he had completed his doctorate at the age of 26 to become a Fellow in Inorganic Chemistry at University College in Oxford. He stayed at University College until his death.

During the 1970s, Orchard led a group of researchers working in the area of photoelectron spectroscopy. This enabled scientists to examine the electronic structure of materials. The research was important for technological innovations in modern electronics, helping with the development of advances such as the personal computer and mobile phone. He published the book Magnetochemistry in 2003.

As well as his research contributions, Orchard also helped to improve the system of undergraduate applications for chemistry at Oxford University.

Personal life
Tony Orchard was an amateur sportsman, playing tennis and snooker. At an early age, he won snooker games with the later world champions Terry Griffiths and Ray Reardon.
Orchard's friends included former United States president Bill Clinton, who he met during the 1960s when Clinton was studying at University College as a Rhodes Scholar.
Orchard was married to his wife Jeanne and later divorced, with two sons and two daughters. He died aged 64 of colon cancer.

References

1941 births
2005 deaths
People from Carmarthen
Alumni of Wadham College, Oxford
Alumni of Merton College, Oxford
Photochemists
Spectroscopists
Inorganic chemists
Theoretical chemists
British chemists
Fellows of University College, Oxford
Deaths from cancer in England
Deaths from colorectal cancer